The Pakistan national cricket team toured New Zealand in January to March 1994 and played a three-match Test series against the New Zealand national cricket team. Pakistan won the series 2–1. New Zealand were captained by Ken Rutherford and Pakistan by Saleem Malik. In addition, the teams played a five-match series of Limited Overs Internationals (LOI) which Pakistan won 3–1 with one match tied.

Test series summary

1st Test

2nd Test

3rd Test

One Day Internationals (ODIs)

Pakistan won the Bank of New Zealand Trophy 3–1, with one match tied.

1st ODI

2nd ODI

3rd ODI

4th ODI

5th ODI

References

External links

1994 in Pakistani cricket
1994 in New Zealand cricket
International cricket competitions from 1991–92 to 1994
New Zealand cricket seasons from 1970–71 to 1999–2000
1994